Write This Down is an American Christian rock band from Minneapolis, Minnesota. Formed in 2005, the band consists of vocalists and guitarists Nate Rockwell and Mike Kuwica, bassist Nick Lombardo and drummer Chad Nichols. Their music has been featured on Internet-based radio stations, receiving regular rotation on RadioU and ChristianRock.Net. On May 10, 2010, their album, Write This Down, peaked at No. 45 on Billboard's Christian Albums chart.

History

The band was formed in 2005 and, after several line-up changes, the band consisted of Johnny Collier, Andy Kalyvas, Chad Nichols, John Oberbeck and Nate Rockwell. The name came after a song on pop-punk band Cartel's The Ransom EP. In 2007, Write This Down released two self-produced EPs. Although their first EP is titled Alarm the Alarm, the original version of the song "Alarm the Alarm" does not appear on this recording. It is released on the Write This Down EP, which was released on September 3, 2007.

After releasing two independent EPs, Write This Down signed to Tooth & Nail Records to record their first full-length studio album. Oberbeck and Kalyvas left the band prior to recording the album. Since then they have added Nick Lombardo and Mike Kuwica to the lineup. Their self-titled album, Write This Down, was released on April 20, 2010.

A second album, Lost Weekend, was released on May 22, 2012. After extensive touring, Johnny Collier decided to leave the band for personal reasons. However, they announced that they're working on a five-track EP and "hopefully a full length to shortly follow". On November 24, 2015, Write This Down self-released their third EP, Foundations, making it the first release without Johnny Collier.

Band members 
Current
 Chad Nichols – drums (since 2005)
 Nate Rockwell – guitar, vocals (since 2005)
 Mike Kuwica – guitar, vocals (since 2011)
 Nick Lombardo - bass (since 2009)

Former
 Johnny Collier – lead vocals (2005-2014)
 Jared Kocka – guitar (2008-2010)
 Andy Kalyvas – bass (2005–2009)
 Aaron Rockwell – guitar (2007-2008)
 John Oberbeck – guitar (2005–2007)

Discography 
Studio albums

EPs

Singles

References 

Christian rock groups from Minnesota
Musical groups established in 2005